Nuestra Belleza Latina 2012 was the sixth season of Nuestra Belleza Latina, and the season finale aired on Univision on May 20, 2012 at 8pm central.

The auditions were shown Sundays, prior to the final 12 being revealed. Auditions were held from December 2011 to February 1, 2012 in six major US cities (Miami, Chicago, New York City, Fort Worth, Houston, Phoenix, Los Angeles, and Morongo) Auditions were also held in San Juan, Puerto Rico. During the audition process, 54 young women were given passes to the semi-finals in Miami. Two additional contestants were chosen from online auditions, with the help of public votes.

The winner of the contest will be awarded a contract to be one of the new faces on many of Univision's programs and award shows, along with a chance to win more than $250,000 in cash and prizes. She will also become a correspondent for one of Univision's top shows and reign as Nuestra Belleza Latina for a year. As an added bonus, the winner will appear on the cover of Cosmopolitan Magazine.

The winner of the competition was Vanessa De Roide, who represented the island of Puerto Rico.

2012 Judges

Contestants

Results

Elimination table

 The contestant was part of the semi-finalists from group 1.
 The contestant was part of the semi-finalists from group 2.
 The contestant won the week's reward challenge.
 The contestant was in the bottom three, but was saved by the other contestants.
 The contestant won the week's reward challenge and was in the bottom two. 
 The contestant was eliminated.
 The contestant was in the bottom four.
 The contestant was in the bottom two.
 The contestant won the week's reward challenge and was eliminated.
 The contestant was a finalist, but did not win.
 The contestant was the runner-up.
 The contestant won Nuestra Belleza Latina 2012.

Countries Being Represented 

 Eliminated
 First Place
 Winner
 Runner-Up
 : Countries Previously won

2012 auditions

Online Castings 

Note: On March 11, it was announced who the two candidates are to travel to Miami, to compete with the rest of the candidates selected.

Episodes

Episode 1 
The 54 candidates traveling to Miami for a chance to enter the Mansion and win the crown are:

Episode 2 {March 11, 2012} (Group 1, 28 participants, 12 selected)  
Guest Artist: Chino y Nacho

Group 1:

12 Chosen:

Eliminated: Karen Garrido, Ashley Garner, Priscilla González, Mayela Caldera, Lisbeth Cañizales, Karina Encarnación, Yaritza Medina, Cinthia Guerrero, Sarani Pineda, Paola Rodríguez, Dimmary Castro, Ester Rivera, Luz Díaz, Juliana Rodríguez, Yara Rivera, and Rosalinda Silver.

Episode 3 {March 18, 2012} (Group 2, 28 participants, 12 selected) 
Guest Artist: Pepe Aguilar

Group 2:

12 Chosen:

Eliminated: Ixchel Cardenas, Geisy Hernadendez, Viviana Granillo, Thalia Lara, Nicole Marquez, Nayeli Valles, Raquel Huerta, Lauren Payao, Saidee Collado, Andrea Castañeda, Ambar Garcia, Diana Rojas, Alma Lopez, Ciara Jimenez, Vanessa Alvares, and Lucia Galeano.

Episode 4 {March 25, 2012} (Selected top 12 finalists to compete in Nuestra Belleza Latina 2012) 
In the third show of Nuestra Belleza Latina, 24 semi-finalists opened the show dancing the theme of Rihanna "We Found Love" with super sexy silver dresses. Twelve of them were to receive the news that would enter the house of beauty to compete for a contract with Univision and $250,000. This night was a gala full of nerves and emotions.
Giselle Blondet informed us that the Venezuelan Gretchen Serrao left the competition due to personal problems. Last week the girls had their first challenge, quinceañera dress and reflect the sweetness of the time to go out in the May issue of Seventeen magazine, the winners were Nataliz Jimenez, Ligia de Uriarte and Vanessa de Roide. Julian assumed that among the winners two were of his team, Nataliz of Dominican Republic and Ligia of Mexico.

The time to reveal the result reached by the public for two weeks to vote for their favorites. Cindy, Ligia, Ximena and Adriana were the first who took the stage for your future in Nuestra Belleza Latina, Cindy but was saved by the votes of the public did not survive the second round.

They have not yet entered the mansion and the girls begun to have conflicts, Giselle showed us the video. Patricia Cardona criticized Karla Marquez for her dance and Essined Aponte criticized Vanessa de Roide, her compatriot. De Roide stated that it upsets her. Elizabeth said Lidislay did not do well in the recording of this talent.

The first bed in the mansion was to Nataliz Jimenez and the second for the Cuban Elizabeth Robaina, the girls met Julian Group 47 percent of the votes from the public. Will Cuba take another crown? Greydis Gil of Cuba obtained the crown in 2009. Nataliz showed his talent of heroin and Elizabeth imitated Osmel Sousa.

Osmel Girls took the stage, the first runner up was Naomi Marroquin of Guatemala, who confessed she did not think being elected by her Spanish. She showed her talent in martial arts. The second chosen by the audience was Shalimar Rivera of Puerto Rico, she sang a song of India.

Lupita Jones' group, Fanny Vargas was the first choice and of course she could not hold back her tears. Osmel did not make the way easy for her, but Lupita supported and is confident that will fight for the crown. Ivanna Rodriguez was the second choice, she showed her talent for acting.

The singer Pablo Montero arrived with his mariachi to sing "Serenata Huasteca" and the girls go crazy. The Mexican pleased a fan with a kiss and Giselle had the pleasure of pinching.

The girls were taught Marcelo Crudele boxing, boxing coach Dale heartily.

Julian elected two more girls Ligia de Uriarte of Mexico, who auditioned in Houston, and Chanty Vargas of Puerto Rico. Lupita elected the Puerto Ricans Vanessa de Roide and Tatiana Ares.

Osmel Sousa explained that it seeks diversity but a real queen with elegance and class. Karol Scott, Venezuelan, was his choice and she showed us her talent for dancing samba. And the last room in the mansion was for the Mexican/Iranian Setareh Khatibi.

 
Guest Artist: Pablo Montero
Challenge of the week: Posing as a 15-year-old teenager. The top 3 winners are...

12 Chosen:

Eliminated:  Patricia Cardona, Lidslay Gonzalez, Stephanie Castellanos, Cindy Arevalo, Flerida Besso, Karla Marqez, Essined Aponte, Ximena Castro, Angelika Rodriguez, Yesenia Beltran, Adriana Bermudez, and Gretchen Serrao.

Episode 5 {April 1, 2012} (Eliminations, Twelve candidates, only Eleven Remain) 
 Guest Artist: Juan Magan
Challenge of the week: the challenge of the week is divided into two groups and the strong winner roup...

 Live challenge: the gateway of Tibet: consisted of the candidates modeling and walking on a runway showing beauty and poise. The best in this challenge was Fanny Vargas the three candidates who did worse in this competition was Vanessa de Roide, Naomi Marroquín, and Elizabeth Robaina.
all three were threatened ...

 Elimination: Host Giselle Blondet revealed the name of the three girls who were threatened and they were: Ligia de Uriarte from Mexico, Vanessa de Roide of Puerto Rico and Venezuelan Karol Scott....  Giselle then revealed that Ligia de Uriarte of Mexico had the lowest number of votes from the public. Vanessa de Roide of Puerto Rico and Venezuelan Karol Scott received votes from the other girls in the competition to see who would go up to see the judges. They decided to threaten Karol Scott, Karol and Ligia went to the judges and the judges decided to save Karol. Ligia was eliminated from the competition getting 12th place. 
Eliminated:  - Ligia de Uriarte

Episode 6 {April 8, 2012} (Eliminations: eleven candidates only ten remain in the mansion of beauty) 
 Guest Artist:  Prince Royce
 Challenge of the week: The challenge was that the candidate with the highest physical strength and Agility in soccer would win $10,000 and the winner was: ...

 Live challenge:Flying beauties: the challenge is that the candidates should this tied to a cable that fly in the air formaque realizadon different activities in the air of different musical genres.
 all three were threatened ...

 Elimination: Giselle Blondet reported early on which girls were the three threatened with the lowest percentage of votes from the public and they were: Chanty Vargas, Tatiana Ares, and Elizabeth Robaina. To avoid elimination these three girls had to receive high scores in the live challenge. Finally the three girls with the lowest scores between the live challenge and the votes of the audience were: Shalimar Rivera, Tatiana Ares, and Elizabeth Robaina. Later Tatiana received the news that she had the lowest audience votes and was threatened. Shalimar and Elizabeth received votes from the other girls and they saved Elizabeth. Tatiana Ares and Shalimar Rivera both from Puerto Rico faced the judges and since there was a tie, the decision to save one of them was in the hands of Julian Gil. In the end Julian saved Shalimar. Tatiana Ares was eliminated and received 11th place.  
 Eliminated:  – Tatiana ares

Episode 7 {April 15, 2012} (Eliminations, only ten of eleven candidates in the competition continue our latin beauty) 
 Guest Artist:  Gloria Trevi
 Challenge of the week:

 Live challenge:
 all three were threatened ...

 Eliminated:  – Elizabeth Robaina

Episode 8 {April 22, 2012} (Eliminations: eight of nine candidates in the competition continue our latin beauty) 

 Challenge of the week:

 Live challenge:
 all three were threatened ...

 Eliminated:  – Naomi Marroquín

Episode 9 {April 29, 2012} (Eliminations: eight candidates, only seven in the competition continue our latin beauty) 
 Guest Artist:  
 Challenge of the week:

 Live challenge:
 all three were threatened ...

 Eliminated:  - Chanty Vargas

Episode 10 {May 06, 2012} (Eliminations: seven candidates remain only six in the competition continue our latin beauty) 
 Guest Artist:  
 Challenge of the week:

 Live challenge:
 all three were threatened ...

 Eliminated:  – Ivanna Rodriguez

Episode 11 {May 13, 2012} (Eliminations: Semifinal ) 

both are threatened by the public .....

both are threatened by the jury .....

 Eliminated:
  – Shalimar Rivera
  – Fanny Vargas

Episode 12 {May 20, 2012} (The Finale: Nuestra Belleza Latina 2012 is crowned) 

 Guest Artists: Juanes and David Bisbal
 Guest Actor: Gabriel Soto

 Eliminated:
  – Nataliz Jiménez
  – Karol Scott
  – Setareh Kahtibi

Final Catwalk Order

Order of elimination

Notes 
1 – This contestant was initially going to be in danger of elimination, but the results of the live challenge saved her from elimination.
2 – This contestant was initially safe from elimination, but the results of the live challenge caused her to be in danger of elimination.
3 – During gala 07, there was no live challenge, and only the two girls in danger faced the risk of elimination. The rest of the contestants were put through simultaneously during the first elimination, and individually during the second elimination.
 Each judge may give the contestant a score that ranges from 1-10. There are three judges, meaning that the greatest possible score is 30 points.
 Elimination and weekly ranks are determined by the public vote. The three contestants with the fewest votes from the public each week, are within danger of elimination. Contestants may escape the danger zone if they receive a high score from the judges for their performance at the live challenge, and if their added scores are high enough. In contrast, contestants that were initially safe, may have to face the risk of elimination if they receive a low score from the judges, and fall below the line of safety.

Groups

Results

Contestant Notes
 Vanessa De Roide represented Carolina at  Miss Puerto Rico 2012, and finished as 1st Runner-Up. She also represented Puerto Rico in Miss Earth 2005 and finished in the Top 8.
 Chanty Vargas represented Puerto Rico at Miss Intercontinental 2011. She had also made it to the top 20 in Nuestra Belleza Latina 2010
 Setareh Khatibi represented Newhall at Miss California USA 2012 and won the Best Swimsuit Award. She would later compete in Nuestra Belleza Latina 2016 where she once again placed 1st Runner-Up.
 Fanny Vargas had a supporting role as Marissa in the 2012 film, Sweetwater.
 Ivanna Rodríguez competed in Nuestra Belleza Nuevo León 2010 where she finished as 1st Runner-up.
 Elizabeth Robaina won Miss Latina US 2010 and later represented USA at the Miss Latin America 2010 where she finished as 4th runner up. She also represented Cuba at Miss International 2011.

Winners

References

External links 
  at Univision.com
 Nuestra Belleza Latina at Mi Pagina
 

Univision original programming